Schinia erosa is a moth of the family Noctuidae. It is found in the desert areas east of the Peninsular Range of southern California. It has also been recorded from south central Arizona.

Adults are on wing from late summer to early November.

The larvae feed on Isocoma acredenia.

External links
Revision of the tertia species complex

Schinia
Moths of North America
Moths described in 1906